Simo Roiha (born 27 December 1991) is a Finnish professional footballer who plays for Kokkolan PV, as a striker.

Career
Roiha signed with Kokkolan PV for the 2019 season.

References

1991 births
Living people
Finnish footballers
FC Santa Claus players
Rovaniemen Palloseura players
Kokkolan Palloveikot players
Veikkausliiga players
Ykkönen players
Kakkonen players
Association football forwards